The 2022 Illinois Attorney General election took place on November 8, 2022, to elect the Attorney General of Illinois. Incumbent Democratic Attorney General Kwame Raoul won re-election to a second term.

Democratic primary

Candidates

Nominee
Kwame Raoul, incumbent attorney general

Endorsements

Results

Republican primary

Candidates

Nominee
Tom DeVore, lawyer

Eliminated in primary
Steve Kim, business attorney, Republican nominee for attorney general in 2010, and Republican candidate for Lieutenant Governor in 2014
David Shestokas, attorney

Endorsements

Polling

Results

General election

Predictions

Endorsements

Polling

Results

See also
Illinois Attorney General

Notes

References

External links
Official campaign websites
Tom DeVore (R) for Attorney General
Kwame Raoul (D) for Attorney General

Attorney General
Illinois
Illinois Attorney General elections